Robin Follman is an American operatic soprano. Her opera credits include performances with Houston Grand Opera, Los Angeles Opera, New York City Opera, Washington National Opera, Michigan Opera Theater, Opera Pacific, Florentine Opera, Singapore Lyric Opera, Lyric Opera Malaysia, Hawaii Opera, and Opera Carolina among others. Her concert work includes performances with the English Chamber Orchestra, the Saint Louis Symphony, the Pacific Symphony Orchestra, the Richmond Symphony, the International Italian Orchestra, the Milwaukee Symphony Orchestra and the Alabama Symphony among others.

References

External links
 Official Website of Robin Follman

American operatic sopranos
Living people
Year of birth missing (living people)